Scottown is a small unincorporated community in Gadsden County, Florida, United States. Scottown is located along Attapugus Highway and borders St. Hebron and St. John communities. People often use Scottown as a venue between Attapulgus, Georgia and Quincy, Florida.

References

Unincorporated communities in Gadsden County, Florida
Tallahassee metropolitan area
Unincorporated communities in Florida